Namur is a town and municipality in the Outaouais region of Quebec, Canada, part of the Papineau Regional County Municipality. It is nicknamed "la Nouvelle Belgique" (New Belgium).

The vast majority of the local population lives off the timber industry, which is marked by the Loggers Summer Festival. Furthermore, the area's excellent fishing and hunting opportunities attract many tourists annually.

History
The first settlers arrived in the area in 1865, the majority originating from the Belgian Province of Namur and mostly Presbyterian Walloons; their family names were Edain, Frison, Pinon, Roquet, Fluhamann, and Van Vanious.  In 1874, the Namur Post Office opened.

From 1886 onward, the area was known as the United Township Municipality of Suffolk-et-Addington. Piece by piece, portions of this united township were detached to form new municipalities: Vinoy in 1920 (since 1996 part of Chénéville), Lac-des-Plages in 1950, and finally Namur in 1964.

Demographics

Mother tongue:
 English as first language: 8.8%
 French as first language: 89.6%
 English and French as first language: 1.6%
 Other as first language: 0.8%

Education

Sir Wilfrid Laurier School Board operates Anglophone public schools:
 Laurentian Regional High School in Lachute

References

External links

Incorporated places in Outaouais
Municipalities in Quebec